The Caughey Western History Association Prize is given annually by the Western History Association to the best book published the previous year on the American West.  The winner receives $2,500 and a certificate.

Winners

2021 - Alice Baumgartner, South to Freedom: Runaway Slaves to Mexico and the Road to the Civil War
2020 - Maurice Crandall, These People Have Always Been a Republic: Indigenous Electorates in the U.S.-Mexico Borderlands, 1598-1912
2019 - Monica Muñoz Martinez, The Injustice Never Leaves You: Anti-Mexican Violence in Texas
2018 - Louis Warren, God's Red Son: The Ghost Dance Religion and the Making of Modern America
2017 - James F. Brooks, Mesa of Sorrows: A History of the Awat'ovi Massacre
2016 - Edward Dallam Melillo, Strangers on Familiar Soil: Rediscovering the Chile-California Connection
2016 - Joshua Reid, The Sea Is My Country: The Maritime World of the Makahs
2015 - Andrew Needham - Power Lines: Phoenix and the Making of the Modern Southwest
2014 - Keith R. Widder - Beyond Pontiac's Shadow: Michilmackinac and the Anglo-Indian War of 1763
2013 - Frederick E. Hoxie - This Indian Country: American Indian Activists and the Place They Made
2012 - Anne F. Hyde - Empires, Nations and Families: A History of the North American West, 1800-1860
2011 - Erika Lee and Judy Yung - Angel Island: Immigrant Gateway to America
2010 - Elliott West - The Last Indian War: The Nez Perce Story
2009 - Pekka Hämäläinen - The Comanche Empire
2008 - B. Byron Price - Charles M. Russell: A Catalogue Raisonné
2007 - Albert L. Hurtado - John Sutter: A Life on the North American Frontier
2006 - Louis S. Warren - Buffalo Bill's America: William Cody and the Wild West Show
2005 - Jeffrey Ostler - The Plains Sioux and U.S. Colonialism from Lewis and Clark to Wounded Knee
2004 - Colin G. Calloway - One Vast Winter Count: The Native American West Before Lewis and Clark
2003 - Will Bagley - Blood of the Prophets: Brigham Young and the Massacre at Mountain Meadows
2002 - Donald Worster - A River Running West: The Life of John Wesley Powell
2001 - Robert V. Hine and John Mack Faragher - The American West: A New Interpretive History
2000 - Walter Nugent - Into the West: The Story of Its People
1999 - Elliott West - The Contested Plains: Indians, Goldseekers, and the Rush to Colorado
1998 - Malcolm J Rorhbough - Days of Gold: The California Gold Rush and the American Nation
1997 - Richard W. Etulain - Re-Imagining the Modern American West: A Century of Fiction, History and Art
1996 - David Wallace Adams - Education for Extinction: American Indians and the Boarding School Experience, 1875-1928
1995 - Clyde A. Milner III, Carol A. O’Connor, Martha A. Sandweiss, eds. - The Oxford History of the American West
1994 - Robert M. Utley - The Lance and the Shield: The Life and Times of Sitting Bull
1993 - David J. Weber The Spanish Frontier in North America

Prior to 1993, it was known as the Western History Association Prize for a “distinguished body of writing”

1992 - Howard Lamar
1991 - W. Turrentine Jackson
1990 - Wallace Stegner
1989 - William T. Hagan
1988 - Robert M. Utley
1987 - Francis Paul Prucha
1986 - Paul W. Gates
1985 - No Award Given
1984 - No Award Given
1983 - Robert G. Athearn

References

Western History Association  - Caughey Western History Prize

American non-fiction literary awards